Marie-Élisabeth Laville-Leroux (27 March 1770 – 23 July 1826)  was a French painter. Like her sister, Marie-Guillemine Benoist, she studied (in 1787) under David.

Her mother,  Marguerite-Marie Lombard, was from Toulouse and her father, René Laville-Leroux was from Brittany. She sometimes exhibited with her sister Marie-Guillemine, and with Henriette, born in 1772. as in the exhibition at la place Dauphine in 1786 where she displayed Dame en satin blanc, garnie de marte; and in 1788, Artémise serre sur son cœur l'urne contenant les cendres de Mausole; and in 1789, Une Vestale infidèle. In 1791, she exhibited Artémise in the Salon de l'Académie.

In 1794 she married Dominique Larrey.

References
 Bulletin de la Société de l'Histoire de l'Art français, 1967, page 244, note 1 (not seen)
 Astrid Reuter, Marie-Guilhelmine Benoist, Gestaltungsraüme einer Künstlerin um 1800 (Berlin: Lukas Verlag, 2002), pp. 109–111

Notes

1770 births
1826 deaths
French women painters
Pupils of Jacques-Louis David
18th-century French painters
19th-century French painters
19th-century French women artists
18th-century French women artists
Sibling artists